The 2019–20 season was Gimnasia y Esgrima's 12th consecutive season in the second division of Argentine football, Primera B Nacional.

The season generally covers the period from 1 July 2019 to 30 June 2020.

Review

Pre-season
Nicolás Caro sealed a departure from Gimnasia to Atlanta on 17 June 2019. Carlos Morel agreed to join Gimnasia y Esgrima on 18 June 2019, penning terms from Deportivo Riestra. Guillermo Pfund was announced as a new incoming on 18 June, but the move fell through on 21 June. They appeared in friendly action for the first time on 22 June, playing two friendlies with Colón of the Primera División at the Estadio Padre Ernesto Martearena; winning 1–0 and losing 4–0. Franco Lazzaroni signed for the club from Ferro Carril Oeste on 24 June, with Ezequiel Gallegos following from Platense two days later. Nahuel Zárate, from Fénix, joined Lobo jujeño on 28 June. Colombian centre-back Junior Bueno went back to his homeland on 29 June, signing a deal with Once Caldas.

Dino Castagno, a defender from Deportivo Español, penned with them on 29 June. They shared friendly wins with Bolivia's Oriente Petrolero on 29 June. 2018–19 loans expired on/around 30 June. Walter Busse was snapped up on 1 July after his release from Ferro Carril Oeste, which preceded the double agreement with Gonzalo Castillejos (San Martín (SJ) and Gonzalo Gómez (Huracán Las Heras) later in the day. On 5 July, Matías Carabajal met the media after securing terms; despite Gimnasia not publicising his arrival - à la with Álvaro Cazula. They experienced a draw and a loss to Atlético Tucumán in friendlies on 11 July. Federico Freire secured terms with San Telmo on 17 July. On the same date, a win apiece occurred in exhibition games at home to San Martín (T).

Facundo Callejo moved to All Boys on 25 July. Agustín Sufi departed to Patronato on a free transfer on 1 August. On 4 August, Gimnasia played San Martín (T) again - as they shared 2–1 wins. 9 August saw Gimnasia meet Central Norte in two friendlies, with the visitors edging a five-goal thriller in the initial match that preceded a 3–1 victory. Gimnasia captured Hernán Hechalar from Independiente Medellín on 13 August, as the Argentine centre-forward came back to Argentina after five years abroad.

August
Gimnasia suffered a defeat away to Deportivo Riestra in their first competitive game of 2019–20 in Primera B Nacional. Gonzalo Castillejos scored in that one, before notching again on matchday two during a 2–1 victory over Chacarita Juniors. Another win followed on 31 August on the road versus Brown.

Squad

Transfers
Domestic transfer windows:3 July 2019 to 24 September 201920 January 2020 to 19 February 2020.

Transfers in

Transfers out

Friendlies

Pre-season
Gimnasia y Esgrima had back-to-back friendlies with Primera División outfit Colón scheduled on 14 June 2019 for 22 June, played neutrally at the Estadio Padre Ernesto Martearena in Salta. Gimnasia would also meet Oriente Petrolero, on 29 June, and Atlético Tucumán, on 11 July. San Martín (T) would also face Gimnasia twice in pre-season on two separate occasions, while also meeting Central Norte.

Competitions

Primera B Nacional

Results summary

Matches
The fixtures for the 2019–20 league season were announced on 1 August 2019, with a new format of split zones being introduced. Gimnasia y Esgrima were drawn in Zone B.

Squad statistics

Appearances and goals

Statistics accurate as of 3 September 2019.

Goalscorers

Notes

References

Gimnasia y Esgrima de Jujuy seasons
Gimnasia y Esgrima